Georgios Agiotis (born 18 March 1999) is a Greek professional footballer who plays as a centre-back.

References

1999 births
Living people
Greek footballers
Greece youth international footballers
Football League (Greece) players
Super League Greece 2 players
Apollon Larissa F.C. players
PAE Kerkyra players
Diagoras F.C. players
Association football defenders
People from Volos
Olympiacos Volos F.C. players